The Bliss-Leavitt Mark 3 torpedo was a Bliss-Leavitt torpedo adopted by the United States Navy in 1906 for use in an anti-surface ship role.

Characteristics
The Bliss-Leavitt Mark 3 was very similar to the Bliss-Leavitt Mark 2 torpedo. The primary difference was a longer range of 4000 yards. Approximately 200 Mark 3s were produced  for the US Navy.

The Bliss-Leavitt Mark 3 was launched from battleships, torpedo boats and cruisers.

See also
American 21 inch torpedo

References

Torpedoes
Torpedoes of the United States
Unmanned underwater vehicles
Bliss-Leavitt torpedoes